The AT&T Pebble Beach Pro-Am is a professional golf tournament on the PGA Tour, held annually at Pebble Beach, California, near Carmel.  The tournament is usually held during the month of February on three different courses, currently Pebble Beach Golf Links, Spyglass Hill Golf Course, and Monterey Peninsula Country Club.

The event was originally known as the Bing Crosby National Pro-Amateur, or just the Crosby Clambake. After Crosby's death in 1977, the tournament was hosted by his family for eight years. The Crosby name was dropped after the 1985 event, and AT&T Corporation became the title sponsor in 1986. It is organized by the Monterey Peninsula Foundation.

History
Founded in 1937, the first National Pro-Am Golf Championship was hosted by entertainer Bing Crosby and Larry Crosby in southern California at Rancho Santa Fe Golf Club in San Diego County, the event's location prior to World War II. Sam Snead won the first tournament, then just 18 holes, with a winner's share of $500. A second round was added in 1938 and was played through 1942.

After the war, it resumed in 1947 as a 54-hole event, up the coast on golf courses near Monterey, where it has been played ever since. Beginning that year, it was played at Pebble Beach Golf Links, Cypress Point Club, and Monterey Peninsula Country Club through 1966. The tournament became a 72-hole event in 1958.

In 1967, the new Spyglass Hill replaced Monterey Peninsula CC as the third course (with the exception of 1977, when it returned to MPCC). After 1990, private Cypress Point was dropped by the PGA Tour because it would not admit an African-American member, and was replaced by Poppy Hills in 1991, which hosted through 2009. Poppy Hills was not well received by the players, primarily due to poor drainage, and MPCC returned to the rotation in 2010.

Notable professionals in recent years have included Tiger Woods, Phil Mickelson, Mark O'Meara, Davis Love III, Jordan Spieth, and Vijay Singh.  Notable celebrities have included fan favorite Bill Murray, Glenn Frey, Kevin Costner, Steve Young, George Lopez, Tom Brady, Bill Belichick, Kenny G, Justin Timberlake, Ray Romano, Clay Walker, and Carson Daly.  Past celebrities included many Hollywood legends, some of whom were accomplished amateur golfers.  Jim Backus, best known as the voice of Mr. Magoo and as Thurston Howell III on Gilligan's Island, made the 36-hole pro-am cut in 1964.

Gene Littler holds a unique record in this event. When he won the 1975 event, it marked the only time that a player had won this particular event as a professional after having previously been the amateur on the winning pro-am team which Littler did as a 23-year-old amateur in 1954.

Tournament playing format

The starting field consists of 156 professionals and 156 amateurs. Each professional is paired with an amateur player. On the first three days, 156 two-man teams will play a better ball format with one round on each of the three courses. The pros also play an individual stroke play format.  On the final day, those professionals and pro-am teams making the 54-hole cut will play on the Pebble Beach Golf Links.

Individual pro cut: At 54 holes, the low 60 scorers plus any ties. Players between 61st and 70th (and ties) will receive both official money and FedEx Cup points, as the cut for this tournament ensures the field is smaller than a standard tournament cut of 70 to accommodate the pro-am teams playing on the last day. They are indicated as MDF (made cut, did not finish); this designation is used in other PGA Tour events when more than 78 players make the cut and the field is reduced to 70 and ties after the third round.

Pro-Am cut: At 54 holes, the low 25 teams, plus any ties.

Only professionals may compete in the individual competition part of the tournament. Amateurs are restricted to playing only in the pro-amateur team competition. The local Pebble Beach tournament officials organize the pairing of professionals with amateurs, while the PGA Tour manages the assignment of the pros' tee times.

Professional field
The professional field consists of 156 players selected using the standard eligibility rankings except that the following shall first be eligible:
 AT&T Pebble Beach winners prior to 2000 and in the last five seasons
 The Players Championship and major championship winners prior to 2000 and in the last five years
There is no open qualifying for this tournament.

Format
Conducted as a planned 72-hole pro-am event, 1958–present. Exceptions are as follows:

 18 holes: 1937
 36 holes (planned): 1938 to 1942
 36 holes, due to bad weather: 1952
 54 holes (planned): 1947 to 1951, 1953 to 1957
 54 holes, due to bad weather: 1974, 1981, 1986, 1998, 1999, and 2009
 In 1996, the first 36 holes were played as scheduled on Thursday and Friday. Rain on Saturday and Sunday prevented the completion of the tournament and it was canceled (54 holes required to be official due to three course setup).
 In 1998, weather conditions prevented the tournament from being finished on schedule (9 holes were played Thursday, 9 on Friday, 18 on Saturday, rain Sunday and Monday). The third round was delayed until August to prevent cancellation similar to 1996. 43 of 168 players withdrew rather than return for the final round.
 No pro-am: 2021
 In 2021, the pro-am section of the tournament was canceled due to safety concerns in relation to the COVID-19 pandemic; as a result Monterey Peninsula was also removed from the course rotation.
 In 2023, the pro-am competition was shortened to 54 holes due to high winds on Saturday, February 4; professionals only competed in the final round on Monday, February 5.

Tournament hosts

Winners

Source:

Multiple winners
Thirteen players have won this tournament more than once through 2022.
5 wins
Mark O'Meara: 1985, 1989, 1990, 1992, 1997
Phil Mickelson: 1998, 2005, 2007, 2012, 2019
4 wins
Sam Snead: 1937, 1938, 1941, 1950 (tie)
3 wins
Jack Nicklaus: 1967, 1972, 1973
Johnny Miller: 1974, 1987, 1994
2 wins
Lloyd Mangrum: 1948, 1953
Dutch Harrison: 1939, 1954
Cary Middlecoff: 1955, 1956
Billy Casper: 1958, 1963
Tom Watson: 1977, 1978
Davis Love III: 2001, 2003
Dustin Johnson: 2009, 2010
Brandt Snedeker: 2013, 2015

In addition, Nicklaus won the U.S. Open at Pebble Beach in 1972, Watson in 1982.

Two others have won an AT&T and a U.S. Open at Pebble Beach; Tom Kite (1983 & 1992), and Tiger Woods (2000 & 2000).

Notes

References

External links

Coverage on the PGA Tour's official site
Pebble Beach Golf Links

PGA Tour events
Golf in California
Pro–am golf tournaments
Sports competitions in California
Sports in Monterey County, California
Tourist attractions in Monterey County, California
Pebble Beach, California
AT&T
Recurring sporting events established in 1937
1937 establishments in California